Bobby Harris Myers (June 27, 1927September 2, 1957) was an American NASCAR driver. He ran 15 Grand National Series races from 1950 until his death in a crash during the 1957 Southern 500.

Career 
Myers began competing in the NASCAR Grand National Division in 1951 at the age of 24. He made two starts in 1951, in his first outing in the 200-lap event at the half-mile dirt Asheville-Weaverville Speedway in Weaverville, North Carolina, Myers finished 16th driving a 1949 Ford. Myers then drove the No. 2 Hudson in the Motor City 250 on the one-mile dirt track at Michigan State Fairgrounds in Detroit where he started 34th and finished 25th.
Myers returned to the NASCAR Grand National Division competition in 1952 driving George Hutchens's No. 6 Ford in the Southern 500 at Darlington. The Ford's engine came apart on lap 145 and relegated him to a 52nd finishing position in a field of 66 cars. Myers won the 1952 Bowman Gray Stadium Modified Championship.

In 1953, Myers drove the No. 18 Oldsmobile in two NASCAR Grand National events. In the Southern 500, he started 50th and worked his way to a 20th finishing position. At the one-mile circular Langhorne Speedway in Langhorne, Pennsylvania, Myers finished 10th.

Myers did not compete in the Grand National Division again until 1956. He drove Ansel Rakestraw's No. 1 Chevrolet at the half-mile asphalt Palm Beach Speedway in West Palm Beach, Florida. He started the event in 10th and finished in 10th. At the Daytona Beach and Road Course, Myers started 63rd of 76 cars and finished 46th failing to collect any of the purse money. At the half-mile dirt Wilson Speedway in Wilson, North Carolina, Myers started 24th and finished 7th. At Langhorne, Myers drove the No. 15W Ford owned by Bill Stroppe. Myers started the race in 8th position, but an engine failure dropped him to 38th. Myers started 12th in the No. 1 Chevrolet in the Virginia 500 at Martinsville but a right front hub failure left him in 15th position after completing 436 of the 500 laps. Myers was back behind the wheel of Bill Stroppe's No. 4 Mercury at Road America in what would be the only Sprint Cup race held at the Elkhart Lake, Wisconsin circuit. He started the race in 14th but a crash took him out on lap 39 and he finished 21st. The Stroppe Mercury carried the No. 76 for the Southern 500 and Myers put it in the 34th starting position. Problems with the gas tank on lap 91 put him out of the event and left him with a 61st finishing spot. Myers was optimistic for the Buddy Shuman 250 at the 4/10-mile dirt Hickory Speedway in Hickory, North Carolina after qualifying sixth, but a radiator problem on lap 105 put him out of the event and left him finishing in 19th position.

In 1957, Myers started sixth at the half-mile dirt Southern States Fairgrounds track in Charlotte, North Carolina driving Whitey Norman's No. 1A Ford, but a blown engine on lap 26 dropped him to a 19th finishing spot.

Death 
At the Southern 500 on September 2, 1957, Myers qualified the No. 4 Petty Enterprises Oldsmobile in the second spot. Myers led his first lap in the NASCAR Grand National Division competition during the race. Myers was involved in a violent crash on lap 27; Fonty Flock was driving Herb Thomas's No. 92 Pontiac and spun on the backstretch (the current start-finish line), stopping perpendicular to the track, in turn three (near the current Turn One following 1997 changes). Paul Goldsmith and Myers both struck the stopped car at full speed.

Flock and Goldsmith both received serious injuries in the crash. Fonty Flock spun and slid to a stop on the backstretch. Bobby Myers slammed into him, immediately followed by Paul Goldsmith. The crash seriously injured Goldsmith, ended Flock's career, and killed Myers. He then flipped side over side and barrel-rolled. Myers died from his injuries.

Legacy 
Myers's son, Danny "Chocolate" Myers later became involved in NASCAR, serving as the gasman on the famous "Flying Aces" pit crew of Richard Childress Racing and seven-time NASCAR Winston Cup Series Champion Dale Earnhardt. Myers' great-nephews, Burt and Jason, were regular competitors on the Whelen Southern Modified Tour until the tour folded in 2016.

In seven years of the NASCAR Grand National competition, Myers made 15 starts and recorded three top-10 finishes.

Myers and his brother Billy are immortalized by the National Motorsports Press Association Myers Brothers award during NASCAR's season-ending prizegiving banquet.

References

External links
 

1927 births
1957 deaths
Filmed deaths in motorsport
NASCAR drivers
Sportspeople from Winston-Salem, North Carolina
Racing drivers from North Carolina
Racing drivers who died while racing
Sports deaths in South Carolina